Frankly Sentimental is the fourth studio album by Frank Sinatra, released on June 20, 1949 as a set of four 78 rpm records and a 10" LP album. 

The tracks were arranged and conducted by Axel Stordahl and his orchestra.

The album is composed of eight songs recorded in eight separate sessions in 1946 and 1947.

Track listing
 "Body and Soul" (E. Heyman, R. Sour, F. Eyton, J. Green) – 3:19
 "Laura" (David Raksin, Johnny Mercer) – 3:12
 "Fools Rush In" (Mercer, Rube Bloom) – 3:04
 "Spring Is Here" (Richard Rodgers, Lorenz Hart) – 2:43
 "One For My Baby (And One More For The Road)" (Harold Arlen, Mercer)
 "Guess I'll Hang My Tears Out to Dry" (Jule Styne, Sammy Cahn)
 "When You Awake" (Henry Nemo)
 "It Never Entered My Mind" (Rodgers, Hart) – 3:34

Personnel
 Frank Sinatra – Vocals
 Axel Stordahl – Arranger, Conductor
 LOS ANGELES MUSICIANS – 1946 TO 1947: William Bloom, Werner Callies, Walter Edelstein, Sam Freed, David Frisina, Howard Halbert, Sol Kindler, Morris King, Eugene Lamas, Dan Lube, Mischa Russell, Felix Slatkin, Gerald Vinci (violins), Abraham Hochstein, Alexander Neiman, Stanley Spiegelman, Dave Sterkin (violas), Fred Goerner, John Sewell, Julius Tannenbaum (celli), Ann Mason (harp), Heinie Beau (clarinet/alto saxophone), Fred Dornbach (clarinet/tenor saxophone?), Herbert Haymer (clarinet/tenor saxophone), Jules Kinsler (clarinet/alto saxophone/flute/bass clarinet), Harry Klee (clarinet/alto saxophone/flute/piccolo), Clyde Hurley, Manny Klein, Rubin "Zeke" Zarchy (trumpets), Hoyt Bohannon, George Jenkins, Edward Kuczborski (trombones), Richard Perissi (French horn), Mark McIntyre (piano), Dave Barbour, Allan Reuss (guitars), Phil Stephens (bass), Ray Hagan (drums)
 NEW YORK MUSICIANS – 1947: Fred Buldrini, Mac Ceppos, Sid Harris, Maurice Hershaft, Harry Katzman, Howard Kay, Sylvan Kirsner, Leo Kruczek, Felix Orlewitz, Merle Pitt, Raoul Polikian, Samuel Rand, Julius Schachter, Zelly Smirnoff, Harry Urbont, Jack Zyde (violins), Harold Colletta, Solomon Deutsch, Harold Furmansky, Isadore Zir (violas), Maurice Brown, Armand Kaproff, George Ricci (celli), Elaine Vito Ricci (harp), Ernie Caceres (clarinet/alto and baritone saxophones), Harold Feldman (clarinet/tenor saxophone/flute/piccolo/oboe/cor anglais), Bernard Kaufman (clarinet/alto saxophone/flute), Mitch Miller (oboe), Toots Mondello (clarinet/alto saxophone), Hymie Schertzer (clarinet/alto saxophone), Wolfe Taninbaum (clarinet/tenor saxophone), Milt Yaner (clarinet/alto and soprano saxophones), Andy Ferretti, Chris Griffin, Bobby Hackett, John Lausen, Red Solomon (trumpets), George Arus, William Pritchard, William Rausch, Anthony Russo (trombones), Joseph Singer (French horn), Johnny Guarnieri, Bob Kitsis (pianoes), Matty Golizio (guitar), Trigger Alpert (bass), Johnny Blowers, Norris "Bunny" Shawker (drums)

References

Frank Sinatra albums
1949 albums
Columbia Records albums
Albums arranged by Axel Stordahl
Albums conducted by Axel Stordahl